Chelqi (also Romanized as Chelqī, Chelghī, Cholāqī, and Chollāqi) is a village in Meyami Rural District, Razaviyeh District, Mashhad County, Razavi Khorasan Province, Iran. At the 2006 census, its population was 631, in 131 families.

References 

Populated places in Mashhad County